This is a list of naval vessels sunk or otherwise severely damaged with loss of life during the Second World War.

See also
 List of maritime disasters
 List of maritime disasters in the 18th century
 List of maritime disasters in the 19th century
 List of maritime disasters in the 20th century
 List of maritime disasters in World War I
 List of maritime disasters in the 21st century 
 Shipwreck
 Lists of shipwrecks
 List of disasters
 List of accidents and disasters by death toll
 List by death toll of ships sunk by submarines
 List of RORO vessel accidents

References

Lists of shipwrecks
World War II naval ships
World War II naval-related lists